Dionisie Alexandru Ghermani (born 1922, Bucharest – July 5, 2009, Bucharest) was a professor, writer, philanthropist, and political activist.

Education and career 
Dionisie Alexandru Ghermani was born in Bucharest. His father, Dionisie Germani (Ghermani) (1877–1948), was an engineer, professor, dean of Construction Faculty of Polytechnic University of Bucharest, and a political activist of the fascist Iron Guard. Dionisie Ghermani attended Saint Sava National College until 1941 and then graduated from the University of Berlin.

While a student at the Saint Sava National College, Dionisie Ghermani joined the local organization of the Cross Brotherhood (Frăţia de Cruce), part of the Iron Guard. He became a leader of a Brotherhood of the Cross in Bucharest. After the unsuccessful Iron Guard Rebellion (January 21—January 23, 1941), he became a political exile in Berlin – Germany.

In 1944–1945, he was a collaborator of the Romanian National Government-in-exile in Vienna, led by Horia Sima. In 1945 became a prisoner of French occupation forces at Innsbruck-Reichenau concentration camp. In August 1946, Dionisie Ghermani was liberated from Innsbruck-Reichenau. Then, he collaborated with British intelligence.

He founded Institut für Rumänienforschung — Munich / Unterhaching (1987). Also, Dionisie Ghermani founded German Romanian Interdisciplinary Research Institute in Bucharest (1994) as a branch of Institut für Rumänienforschung; since 1995, it is autonomous.

Dionisie Ghermani died in Bucharest on July 5, 2009.

Works 
 Dionisie A. Ghermani, "Nationalistischer 'Internationalismus' am Beispiel Rumaeniens." Canadian Review of Studies in Nationalism II, no.2 (1974/1975): 279–296.
 Dionisie Ghermani, Desluşiri naţionale. Mit, utopie, paradigmă, ideologie, epistemologie. București, 1993, 23 pp.
 Dionisie Ghermani, Despre democraţie. Cuvânt înainte de: Stroescu-Stânişoară, Nicolae. Cluj, Dacia, 1996, 176 pp.
 Dionisie Ghermani, Mutationen und Stagnation, Strukturveränderungen und Sklerese auf dem Shachbrett der Internationalen Politik. In: EAS, 1998, 1, p. 23-32.
 Dionisie Ghermani,. Die neueste Auflage des russischen Imperialismus In: Omagiu Virgil Cândea la 75 de ani. București, 2002, I, p. 291-313.
 Dionisie Ghermani, Die nationale Souveränitätspolitik der SR Rumänien. Munich: Oldenbourg, 1981.
 Dionisie Ghermani, Die kommunistische Umdeutung der rumánischen Geschichte unter besonderer Berücksichtigung des Mittelalters (Munich: Verlag R. Oldenbourg, 1967).
 Dionisie Ghermani, Alexandru Boldur zum 90. Geburtstag, in: Südost-Forschungen 35, 1976, S. 248
 Dionisie Ghermani, Alexander von Randa (1906–1975) [Nachruf], in: Südost-Forschungen 35, 1976, S. 249–250.

External links
 https://web.archive.org/web/20090122121111/http://icirg.ro/

1922 births
2009 deaths
Writers from Bucharest
Members of the Iron Guard
20th-century Romanian politicians
Romanian essayists
Romanian textbook writers
Romanian journalists
Romanian anti-communists
Romanian expatriates in Germany
Academic staff of the Politehnica University of Bucharest
Romanian activists
Romanian biographers
Romanian male writers
Male biographers
Romanian magazine editors
Romanian memoirists
Romanian political scientists
Romanian philanthropists
Romanian science writers
Romanian translators
Romanian prisoners of war
World War II prisoners of war held by France
20th-century translators
20th-century Romanian historians
Male essayists
20th-century essayists
20th-century philanthropists
20th-century journalists
20th-century memoirists
20th-century political scientists